The North Fork Coquille River is a  tributary of the Coquille River in the southern Oregon Coast Range in the U.S. state of Oregon.

Course

The river first flows north, but then turns west and south. It intersects Laverne County Park, passes through the rural community of Fairview and then Rock Prairie County Park before receiving Middle Creek from the left. It continues south through the hills and receives the East Fork Coquille River, also from the left, at the rural community of Gravelford. The river then turns west, meandering to a point north of Myrtle Point. Here it joins the South Fork Coquille River to form the Coquille, which flows west to the Pacific Ocean at Bandon.

Tributaries
Named tributaries of the North Fork Coquille River from source to mouth are Little North Fork Coquille River followed by North Fork, Giles, Neely, Whilley, Moon, Hudson, and Swayne creeks. Below this come Evans, Steele, Blair, Lost, Middle, Schoolhouse, Garage, Wood, and Wimer creeks. Next is the East Fork Coquille River followed by Johns, Kessler, Carey, and Llewellyn creeks.

Watershed
About 70 percent of the Coquille River basin is forested, and most of the forest land produces commercial timber. Other land uses in the basin include farming and mining. Population is very sparse on the forested slopes above the valleys.

See also
 List of longest streams of Oregon
 List of rivers of Oregon

References

External links
Coquille Watershed Association

Rivers of Oregon
Rivers of Coos County, Oregon